The 1792 United States presidential election in New Jersey took place between November 2 and December 5, 1792 as part of the 1792 United States presidential election. The state legislature chose seven members of the Electoral College, each of whom, under the provisions of the Constitution prior to the passage of the Twelfth Amendment, cast two votes for President.

New Jersey's seven electors each cast one vote for incumbent George Washington and one vote for incumbent Vice President John Adams.

See also
 United States presidential elections in New Jersey

References

New Jersey
1792
1792 New Jersey elections